The Hetebrink House is a Mission Revival style historic home in Fullerton, California, built in 1914 for John Hetebrink. Located on the south-east corner of what is now Fullerton College, the building has been uninhabited since 2001.

History 
John Hetebrink —the "Tomato King" — was one of the original settlers of Fullerton and owned two 40-acre ranches north of Chapman Avenue, much of which is now occupied Fullerton College and California State University, Fullerton. Although the land the house stands on was originally a tomato field, the ranches are said to have held walnut and orange groves as well. Hetebrink built the house in 1914, the year after Fullerton College opened next-door.

Albert "Pete" Hetebrink — the third of John's seven children (1900-2001) and Fullerton College's 1923 student body president— was a member of the Ku Klux Klan in 1924 (the same year the group became the majority on neighboring Anaheim's city council) and used the home as a meeting place for the group.

In the 1970s, Pete offered the property to Fullerton College, which had by then bought up much of the surrounding acreage the ranch originally occupied. There exists debating stories on the order of events, but the result was Pete later rescinding his offer, with the reason being the college had planned to turn it into a parking-lot (joining the two lots that currently flank it).

The house was submitted to the National Register of Historic Places on May 24, 1993, and added on July 1 of the same year.

The house is still owned by the Hetebrink family. The last known resident of the house was Pete, and has been left unoccupied since his death in 2001. As of March 2019, the structure itself has been in a state of disrepair.

References 

Houses on the National Register of Historic Places in California